Warithrips is a genus of thrips in the family Phlaeothripidae.

Species
 Warithrips acaciae
 Warithrips aridum
 Warithrips maelzeri
 Warithrips polydens
 Warithrips polysensori

References

Phlaeothripidae
Thrips
Thrips genera